Tapinomini is a tribe of Dolichoderinae ants with 6 genera and one extinct genus.

Genera
Aptinoma Fisher, 2009
Axinidris Weber, 1941
†Ctenobethylus Brues, 1939
Ecphorella Forel, 1909
Liometopum Mayr, 1861
Tapinoma Foerster, 1850
Technomyrmex Mayr, 1872

References

Dolichoderinae
Ant tribes